Bouchegouf is a town and commune in Guelma Province, Algeria. According to the 1998 census it has a population of 14,979.

References

Communes of Guelma Province